"Six Degrees of Inner Turbulence" is the sixth song and title track on the album of the same name, written and performed by progressive metal/rock band Dream Theater. Though the song is essentially broken up into eight movements on separate tracks, it lasts 42 minutes in full and takes up the entire second CD of the album. The song was conceived when keyboardist Jordan Rudess wrote what would become the "Overture" section, and the band took various melodies and ideas contained within it and expanded them into segments of the complete piece. The song explores the stories of six individuals suffering from various mental illnesses. Particularly represented are bipolar disorder, post-traumatic stress disorder, schizophrenia, post-partum depression, autism, and dissociative identity disorder.

The song contains influences of the classical, metal, folk and progressive genres and weaves through many time signatures, including 4/4, 5/4, 6/8, and 7/8. Clocking in at 42 minutes, it is the longest song Dream Theater has recorded; to ease scrolling through the song, Mike Portnoy gave each movement their own track, and split the full song into eight tracks.

The song was played in its entirety on Score, with the "Octavarium Orchestra" playing "Overture" and backing for the rest of the piece, except for "The Test That Stumped Them All".

Sections
"I. Overture" – 6:50 (instrumental)
"II. About to Crash" – 5:50 (Petrucci)
"III. War Inside My Head" – 2:08 (Portnoy)
"IV. The Test That Stumped Them All" – 5:03 (Portnoy)
"V. Goodnight Kiss" – 6:17 (Portnoy)
"VI. Solitary Shell" – 5:47 (Petrucci)
"VII. About to Crash (Reprise)" – 4:04 (Petrucci)
"VIII. Losing Time/Grand Finale" – 5:59 (Petrucci)

Personnel
James LaBrie - lead vocals
John Petrucci - guitar, backing vocals
John Myung - bass
Jordan Rudess - keyboards
Mike Portnoy - drums, backing vocals, co-lead vocals on "War Inside My Head"

References

Dream Theater songs
2001 songs
Songs written by John Petrucci
Songs written by John Myung
Songs written by Mike Portnoy
Songs about mental health
Songs about diseases and disorders
Bipolar disorder in fiction
Fictional portrayals of schizophrenia
Songs about depression
Works about autism
Dissociative identity disorder in popular culture
Vietnam War in popular culture
Autism in the arts
Post-traumatic stress disorder in fiction